Alexander Bern Bruce (September 17, 1853 – 1909) was a Scottish American baker and politician who served as the twenty second Mayor of Lawrence, Massachusetts.

Personal life 
Alexander was born on September 17, 1853 to David and Jemima (Bern) Bruce. On September 24, 1870, he married Mary Hannah Mitchell in Lawrence, Massachusetts. They had one son, David Bruce.  Alexander died of typhoid fever on September 6, 1909.

Bibliography
Massachusetts of Today: A Memorial of the State, Historical and Biographical, Issued for the World's Columbian Exposition at Chicago, page 463, (1892).
Men of progress: One thousand Biographical Sketches and Portraits of Leaders in Business and Professional life in the Commonwealth of Massachusetts, page 373, (1896).

Footnotes

1853 births
1909 deaths
Mayors of Lawrence, Massachusetts
Massachusetts city council members
Massachusetts Democrats
People from Brechin
Scottish emigrants to the United States
19th-century American politicians